The 2003–04 Detroit Red Wings season was the 78th National Hockey League season in Detroit, Michigan.  Despite multiple injuries to key players, the Wings found themselves once again winning the Presidents' Trophy for having the best regular season record in the NHL, scoring 109 points.  In the post-season, they advanced to the Western Conference Semifinals, where they were eliminated by the eventual Western Conference champion Calgary Flames in six games.

Two Red Wings were named to the roster for the 2004 All-Star Game: defenseman Nicklas Lidstrom and center Pavel Datsyuk. Lidstrom was voted into his eighth appearance at the All-Star game by fans, and Datsyuk was selected to the roster for his first appearance.

The Red Wings sold out all 41 home games in 2003–04 as 20,066 fans packed Joe Louis Arena for every regular season and playoff game played in Detroit.

Goaltending controversy
Detroit's early exit from the 2003 Stanley Cup playoffs left Curtis Joseph to be heavily scrutinized by the media as to whether or not he was up to task to start for Detroit.  During the subsequent offseason, Dominik Hasek shocked the hockey world when he announced he was coming out of retirement and fulfilling his contractual obligation to the Red Wings. Given their previous success with Hasek, the Red Wings welcomed him back to the team.

With the Wings appearing to favor Hasek as their starting goaltender, Joseph opted to have surgery to repair his ankle prior to the start of the season, resulting with the Red Wings using Hasek and Manny Legace as their goaltending tandem.  When Joseph returned from injury and subsequent conditioning assignment in the minors, anger quickly grew on and off the ice between Hasek and Joseph. General Manager Ken Holland attempted to move Joseph to alleviate the situation, but Holland was not able to find a trade partner nor give Joseph up via the waiver wire due to the hefty terms of his contract (the contract had two years remaining with an annual salary of US$8 million and a no-trade clause). Unable to continue holding three goaltenders on roster, Detroit elected to send Joseph to Detroit's minor league affiliate, the Grand Rapids Griffins, on a permanent basis following a poor performance against the Washington Capitals.

While Hasek assumed the starting role, he did not do so with ease. Hasek was not conditioned properly to handle the competition at the NHL level and was wrought with inconsistent play and injuries.  By December 2003, both Hasek and Legace went down with injuries and Joseph was recalled from the minors, along with Joey MacDonald. While MacDonald was returned to the minors when Legace returned from injury, Joseph remained with the Red Wings as Hasek opted to remain on the injured reserve and did not return for the remainder of the season.

Joseph and Legace would find themselves in a platoon situation until Joseph injured his ankle in a contest against the San Jose Sharks.  The Red Wings recalled Marc Lamothe from the Griffins to support Legace.  Lamothe would appear in two games during his time with Detroit, making him the fifth goaltender to dress for Detroit and the fourth to play for them that season (MacDonald did not play in any games while on roster). Lamothe was returned to the minors once Joseph returned from injury.

Despite being viewed by many as Detroit's "third" goaltender, Manny Legace ended up the de facto starting goaltender for the season, leading the other goaltenders on the team in games played, wins and shutouts. (At the time, those were also career records for Legace.) Legace also had a better save percentage and goals against average (GAA) than either Hasek or Joseph. Based on his regular season play, Legace was named the starting goaltender going into the playoffs. During the opening round against the Nashville Predators, Legace won the first two games, but was pulled after the fourth game following consecutive three-goal losses.

Joseph took over the starting duties and responded admirably, posting a .300 GAA, .977 save percentage and one shutout for the remainder of the series.  While Joseph had a strong performance against Calgary (1.83 GAA and .928 SV%), Detroit suffered an offensive drought and, with the series tied at two games a piece, were shut-out the final two games of the series, eliminating Detroit from the playoffs.

Joseph never appeared for the Red Wings again, as the last year of his contract was nullified by the 2004–05 NHL lockout. Instead, Joseph signed with the Phoenix Coyotes once the lockout was resolved.  Legace went on to assume the starting role for Detroit, but was released after the season following another disappointing playoff exit.  Hasek appeared with the Ottawa Senators during the 2005–06 season, but later returned to Detroit for what would be his last two seasons as an NHL goaltender.

Regular season 
The Red Wings tied the Tampa Bay Lightning for most short-handed goals scored in the NHL, with 15, and had the best penalty-kill percentage in the League (86.75%).

Season standings 

For complete final standings, see 2003–04 NHL season

Playoffs
The Detroit Red Wings ended the 2003–04 regular season as the Western Conference's first seed and played the Nashville Predators in the first round. They defeated Nashville in six games and met the Calgary Flames in the second round. Calgary would go on to defeat Detroit and reach the Stanley Cup Finals, losing in Game 7 to the Tampa Bay Lightning.

Schedule and results

Regular season

|- align="center" bgcolor="#bbffbb" 
| 1 || October 9 || Los Angeles || 2 – 3 || Detroit || || Hasek || 20,066 || 1–0–0 || 2 || 
|- align="center" bgcolor="#bbffbb" 
| 2 || October 11 || Detroit || 3 – 2 || Ottawa || OT || Hasek || 18,500 || 2–0–0 || 4 || 
|- align="center" bgcolor="#bbffbb" 
| 3 || October 16 || Vancouver || 2 – 3 || Detroit || || Hasek || 20,066 || 3–0–0 || 6 || 
|- align="center" bgcolor="#ffbbbb" 
| 4 || October 18 || Detroit || 3 – 4 || Pittsburgh || || Hasek || 13,421 || 3–1–0 || 6 || 
|- align="center" bgcolor="#ffbbbb"  
| 5 || October 20 || Detroit || 1 – 2 || Montreal || || Hasek || 19,407 || 3–2–0 || 6 || 
|- align="center" bgcolor="#bbffbb" 
| 6 || October 22 || Columbus || 1 – 4 || Detroit || || Legace || 20,066 || 4–2–0 || 8 || 
|- align="center" bgcolor="#bbffbb" 
| 7 || October 24 || Dallas || 0 – 4 || Detroit || || Hasek || 20,066 || 5–2–0 || 10 || 
|- align="center" bgcolor="#ffbbbb"  
| 8 || October 25 || Detroit || 1 – 3 || NY Rangers || || Hasek || 18,200 || 5–3–0 || 10 || 
|- align="center" bgcolor="#ffbbbb"  
| 9 || October 29 || St. Louis || 6 – 5 || Detroit || || Legace || 20,066 || 5–4–0 || 10 || 
|- align="center" bgcolor="#ffbbbb"  
| 10 || October 30 || Detroit || 3 – 5 || Nashville || || Joseph || 12,322 || 5–5–0 || 10 || 
|-

|- align="center" bgcolor="#ffffbb" 
| 11 || November 1 || Detroit || 4 – 4 || Edmonton || OT || Legace || 16,839 || 5–5–1–0 || 11 || 
|- align="center" bgcolor="#ffbbbb" 
| 12 || November 3 || Detroit || 1 – 5 || Vancouver || || Legace || 18,630 || 5–6–1–0 || 11 || 
|- align="center" bgcolor="#bbffbb" 
| 13 || November 4 || Detroit || 3 – 0 || Calgary || || Joseph || 15,259 || 6–6–1–0 || 13 || 
|- align="center" bgcolor="#ffbbbb"
| 14 || November 8 || Nashville || 4 – 3 || Detroit || || Joseph || 20,066 || 6–7–1–0 || 13 || 
|- align="center" bgcolor="#bbffbb" 
| 15 || November 10 || Chicago || 0 – 3 || Detroit || || Hasek || 20,066 || 7–7–1–0 || 15 || 
|- align="center" bgcolor="#bbffbb" 
| 16 || November 12 || Detroit || 6 – 2 || Dallas || || Hasek || 18,532 || 8–7–1–0 || 17 || 
|- align="center" bgcolor="#bbffbb" 
| 17 || November 14 || Detroit || 4 – 3 || Chicago || OT || Hasek || 21,856 || 9–7–1–0 || 19 || 
|- align="center" bgcolor="#ffffbb"
| 18 || November 15 || Detroit || 1 – 1 || Minnesota || OT || Hasek || 18,568 || 9–7–2–0 || 20 || 
|- align="center" bgcolor="#bbffbb"
| 19 || November 19 || Columbus || 1 – 5 || Detroit || || Legace || 20,066 || 10–7–2–0 || 22 || 
|- align="center" bgcolor="#ffbbbb"
| 20 || November 20 || Detroit || 0 – 3 || Columbus || || Legace || 18,136 || 10–8–2–0 || 22 || 
|- align="center" bgcolor="#bbffbb" 
| 21 || November 22 || Detroit || 5 – 2 || Minnesota || || Joseph || 18,568 || 11–8–2–0 || 24 || 
|- align="center" bgcolor="#ffbbbb" 
| 22 || November 24 || Washington || 4 – 1 || Detroit || || Joseph || 20,066 || 11–9–2–0 || 24 || 
|- align="center" bgcolor="#bbffbb" 
| 23 || November 26 || Edmonton  || 1 – 7 || Detroit || || Legace || 20,066 || 12–9–2–0 || 26 || 
|- align="center" bgcolor="#bbffbb" 
| 24 || November 28 || NY Islanders || 0 – 6 || Detroit || || Legace || 20,066 || 13–9–2–0 || 28 || 
|- align="center" bgcolor="#bbffbb" 
| 25 || November 29 || Detroit || 2 – 1 || St. Louis || || Legace || 20,006 || 14–9–2–0 || 30 || 
|-

|- align="center" bgcolor="#bbffbb" 
| 26 || December 3 || Anaheim || 2 – 7  || Detroit || || Legace || 20,066 || 15–9–2–0 || 32 || 
|- align="center" bgcolor="#ffffbb" 
| 27 || December 4 || Detroit || 4 – 4 || St. Louis || OT || Hasek || 18,504 || 15–9–3–0 || 33 || 
|- align="center" bgcolor="#ffbbbb" 
| 28 || December 6 || Detroit || 2 – 5 || Toronto || || Legace || 19,470 || 15–10–3–0 || 33 || 
|- align="center" bgcolor="#bbffbb" 
| 29 || December 8 || Los Angeles || 2 – 3 || Detroit || OT || Hasek || 20,066 || 16–10–3–0 || 35 || 
|- align="center" bgcolor="#bbffbb" 
| 30 || December 10 || Detroit || 7 – 2 || Buffalo || || Joseph || 16,283 || 17–10–3–0 || 37 || 
|- align="center" 
| 31 || December 11 || Detroit || 3 – 4 || Chicago || OT || Joseph || 18,489 || 17–10–3–1 || 38 || 
|- align="center" bgcolor="#bbffbb"
| 32 || December 13 || Detroit || 5 – 1 || Washington || || Joseph || 18,277 || 18–10–3–1 || 40 || 
|- align="center" bgcolor="#bbffbb" 
| 33 || December 15 || Florida || 1 – 4 || Detroit || || Joseph || 20,066 || 19–10–3–1 || 42 || 
|- align="center" bgcolor="#bbffbb" 
| 34 || December 17 || San Jose || 2 – 2 || Detroit || OT || Joseph || 20,066 || 20–10–3–1 || 44 || 
|- align="center" bgcolor="#bbffbb" 
| 35 || December 19 || Chicago || 2 – 3 || Detroit || || Legace || 20,066 || 21–10–3–1 || 46 || 
|- align="center" bgcolor="#ffbbbb" 
| 36 || December 20 || Detroit || 0 – 1 || Nashville || || Joseph || 17,113 || 21–11–3–1 || 46 || 
|- align="center" bgcolor="#bbffbb"
| 37 || December 22 || St. Louis || 1 – 2 || Detroit || || Joseph || 20,066 || 22–11–3–1 || 48 || 
|- align="center" bgcolor="#ffffbb"
| 38 || December 26 || Minnesota || 2 – 2 || Detroit || OT || Joseph || 20,066 || 22–11–4–1 || 49 || 
|- align="center" bgcolor="#ffbbbb"
| 39 || December 28 || Detroit || 0 – 3 || Chicago || || Legace || 21,122 || 22–12–4–1 || 49 || 
|- align="center" bgcolor="#bbffbb"
| 40 || December 31 || Atlanta || 5 – 6 || Detroit || OT || Joseph || 20,066 || 23–12–4–1 || 51 || 
|-

|- align="center" bgcolor="#bbffbb" 
| 41 || January 2 || Detroit || 4 – 1 || Carolina || || Joseph || 17,053 || 24–12–4–1 || 53 || 
|- align="center" bgcolor="#bbffbb" 
| 42 || January 3 || Anaheim || 1 – 3 || Detroit || || Legace || 20,066 || 25–12–4–1 || 55 || 
|- align="center" bgcolor="#bbffbb"
| 43 || January 5 || Nashville || 0 – 6 || Detroit || || Joseph  || 20,066 || 26–12–4–1 || 57 || 
|- align="center" bgcolor="#ffbbbb"  
| 44 || January 7 || Boston || 3 – 0 || Detroit || || Joseph ||20,066 || 26–13–4–1 || 57 || 
|- align="center"
| 45 || January 10 || Detroit || 1 – 2 || Boston || OT || Joseph || 17,565 || 26–13–4–2 || 58 || 
|- align="center" bgcolor="#bbffbb" 
| 46 || January 14 || Chicago || 2 – 4 || Detroit || || Legace || 20,066 || 27–13–4–2 || 60 || 
|- align="center" bgcolor="#ffffbb" 
| 47 || January 16 || Phoenix || 3 – 3 || Detroit || OT || Joseph || 20,066 || 27–13–5–2 || 61 || 
|- align="center" bgcolor="#ffbbbb" 
| 48 || January 19 || Detroit || 1 – 2 || San Jose || || Joseph || 17,361 || 27–14–5–2 || 61 || 
|- align="center" bgcolor="#ffffbb" 
| 49 || January 21 || Detroit || 2 – 2 || Anaheim || OT || Legace || 17,174 || 27–14–6–2 || 62 || 
|- align="center" bgcolor="#bbffbb" 
| 50 || January 22 || Detroit || 5 – 4 || Los Angeles || || Joseph || 18,118 || 28–14–6–2 || 64 || 
|- align="center" bgcolor="#ffbbbb" 
| 51 || January 24 || Detroit || 2 – 5 || Phoenix || || Joseph || 19,019 || 28–15–6–2 || 64 || 
|- align="center" bgcolor="#ffffbb"
| 52 || January 26 || Detroit || 2 – 2 || Dallas || OT || Legace || 18,532 || 28–15–7–2 || 65 || 
|- align="center" bgcolor="#bbffbb"
| 53 || January 29 || New Jersey || 2 – 5 || Detroit || || Joseph || 20,066 || 29–15–7–2 || 67 || 
|- align="center" bgcolor="#ffffbb"
| 54 || January 31 || Carolina || 4 – 4 || Detroit || OT || Legace || 20,066 || 30–15–8–2 || 68 || 
|-

|- align="center" bgcolor="#bbffbb" 
| 55 || February 3 || Detroit || 4 – 1 || Nashville || || Legace || 15,134 || 30–15–8–2 || 70 || 
|- align="center" bgcolor="#bbffbb" 
| 56 || February 5 || Detroit || 3 – 2 || Colorado || OT || Joseph || 18,007 || 31–15–8–2 || 72 || 
|- align="center" bgcolor="#bbffbb" 
| 57 || February 11 || San Jose || 2 – 4 || Detroit || || Legace || 20,066 || 32–15–8–2 || 74 || 
|- align="center" bgcolor="#ffbbbb"  
| 58 || February 14 || Colorado || 5 – 2 || Detroit || || Legace || 20,066 || 32–16–8–2 || 74 || 
|- align="center" bgcolor="#bbffbb" 
| 59 || February 16 || Edmonton || 1 – 2 || Detroit || || Legace || 20,066 || 33–16–8–2 || 76 || 
|- align="center" bgcolor="#bbffbb"  
| 60 || February 18 || Phoenix || 2 – 5 || Detroit || || Legace || 20,066 || 34–16–8–2 || 78 || 
|- align="center" bgcolor="#bbffbb" 
| 61 || February 20 || St. Louis || 1 – 5 || Detroit || || Legace || 20,066 || 35–16–8–2 || 80 || 
|- align="center" bgcolor="#ffffbb" 
| 62 || February 23 || Detroit || 1 – 1 || Edmonton || OT || Lamothe || 16,839 || 35–16–9–2 || 81 || 
|- align="center" bgcolor="#ffbbbb"  
| 63 || February 24 || Detroit || 2 – 4 || Vancouver || || Legace || 18,630 || 35–17–9–2 || 81 || 
|- align="center" bgcolor="#bbffbb" 
| 64 || February 26 || Detroit || 2 – 1 || Calgary || || Legace || 17,862 || 36–17–9–2 || 83 || 
|- align="center" bgcolor="#bbffbb" 
| 65 || February 29 || Philadelphia || 2 – 4 || Detroit || || Legace || 20,066 || 37–17–9–2 || 85 || 
|-

|- align="center" bgcolor="#bbffbb"
| 66 || March 3 || Calgary || 1 – 2 || Detroit || || Legace || 20,066 || 38–17–9–2 || 87 || 
|- align="center" bgcolor="#bbffbb" 
| 67 || March 5 || Vancouver || 1 – 3 || Detroit || || Legace || 20,066 || 39–17–9–2 || 89 || 
|- align="center" bgcolor="#ffffbb"
| 68 || March 8 || Tampa Bay || 1 – 1 || Detroit || OT || Legace || 20,066 || 39–17–10–2 || 90 || 
|- align="center" bgcolor="#bbffbb"
| 69 || March 11 || Detroit || 4 – 2 || Columbus || || Joseph || 18,136 || 40–17–10–2 || 92 || 
|- align="center" bgcolor="#bbffbb"
| 70 || March 13 || Dallas || 0 – 3 || Detroit || || Legace || 20,066 || 41–17–10–2 || 94 || 
|- align="center" bgcolor="#bbffbb"
| 71 || March 14 || Nashville || 2 – 3 || Detroit || OT || Joseph || 20,066 || 42–17–10–2 || 96 || 
|- align="center" bgcolor="#ffbbbb"
| 72 || March 16 || Calgary || 4 – 1 || Detroit || || Legace || 20,066 || 42–18–10–2 || 96 || 
|- align="center" bgcolor="#ffffbb"
| 73 || March 18 || Detroit || 1 – 1 || Phoenix || OT || Joseph || 18,704 || 42–18–11–2 || 97 || 
|- align="center" bgcolor="#bbffbb"
| 74 || March 20 || Detroit || 4 – 2 || Los Angeles || || Joseph || 18,118 || 43–18–11–2 || 99 || 
|- align="center" bgcolor="#ffbbbb"
| 75 || March 21 || Detroit || 6 – 8 || Anaheim || || Joseph || 17,174 || 43–19–11–2 || 99 || 
|- align="center" bgcolor="#ffbbbb"
| 76 || March 23 || Detroit || 2 – 5 || San Jose || || Legace || 17,496 || 43–20–11–2 || 99 || 
|- align="center" bgcolor="#bbffbb"
| 77 || March 25 || Detroit || 3 – 1 || Colorado || || Legace || 18,007 || 44–20–11–2 || 101 || 
|- align="center" bgcolor="#bbffbb"
| 78 || March 27 || Colorado || 0 – 2 || Detroit || || Legace || 20,066 || 45–20–11–2 || 103 || 
|- align="center" bgcolor="#bbffbb"
| 79 || March 29 || Minnesota || 3 – 5 || Detroit || || Legace || 20,066 || 46–20–11–2 || 105 || 
|- align="center" bgcolor="#bbffbb"
| 80 || March 31 || Detroit || 3 – 2 || Columbus || || Legace || 18,136 || 47–20–11–2 || 107 || 
|-

|- align="center" bgcolor="#bbffbb"
| 81 || April 1 || Detroit || 3 – 2 || St. Louis || || Lamothe || 20,018 || 48–20–11–2 || 109 || 
|- align="center" bgcolor="#ffbbbb"
| 82 || April 3 || Columbus || 4 – 1 || Detroit || || Legace || 20,066 || 48–21–11–2 || 109 || 
|-

|-
| Legend:

Playoffs

|- align="center"  bgcolor="#bbffbb"
| 1 || April 7 || Nashville || 1–3 || Detroit ||  || Legace || 20,066 || Red Wings lead 1–0 || 
|- align="center"  bgcolor="#bbffbb"
| 2 || April 10 || Nashville || 1–2 || Detroit || || Legace || 20,066 || Red Wings lead 2–0 || 
|- align="center"  bgcolor="#ffbbbb"
| 3 || April 11 || Detroit || 1–3 || Nashville ||  || Legace || 17,113 || Red Wings lead 2–1 || 
|- align="center"  bgcolor="#ffbbbb"
| 4 || April 13 || Detroit || 0–3 || Nashville || || Legace || 17,113 || Series tied 2–2 || 
|- align="center"  bgcolor="#bbffbb"
| 5 || April 15 || Nashville || 1–4 || Detroit || || Joseph || 20,066 || Red Wings lead 3–2 || 
|- align="center"  bgcolor="#bbffbb"
| 6 || April 17 || Detroit || 2–0 || Nashville || || Joseph || 17,329 || Red Wings win 4–2 || 
|-

|- align="center"  bgcolor="#ffbbbb"
| 1 || April 22 || Calgary || 2–1 || Detroit || OT || Joseph || 20,066 || Flames lead 1–0 || 
|- align="center"  bgcolor="#bbffbb"
| 2 || April 24 || Calgary || 2–5 || Detroit || || Joseph || 20,066 || Series tied 1–1 || 
|- align="center"  bgcolor="#ffbbbb"
| 3 || April 27 || Detroit || 2–3 || Calgary ||  || Joseph || 19,289 || Flames lead 2–1 || 
|- align="center"  bgcolor="#bbffbb"
| 4 || April 29 || Detroit || 4–2 || Calgary || || Joseph || 19,289 || Series tied 2–2 || 
|- align="center"  bgcolor="#ffbbbb"
| 5 || May 1 || Calgary || 1–0 || Detroit || || Joseph || 20,066 || Flames lead 3–2 || 
|- align="center"  bgcolor="#ffbbbb"
| 6 || May 3 || Detroit || 0–1 || Calgary || OT || Joseph || 19,289 || Flames win 4–2 || 
|-

|-
| Legend:

Player statistics

Scoring
 Position abbreviations: C = Center; D = Defense; G = Goaltender; LW = Left Wing; RW = Right Wing
  = Joined team via a transaction (e.g., trade, waivers, signing) during the season. Stats reflect time with the Red Wings only.

Goaltending

Awards and records

Awards

Milestones

Transactions
The Red Wings were involved in the following transactions from June 10, 2003, the day after the deciding game of the 2003 Stanley Cup Finals, through June 7, 2004, the day of the deciding game of the 2004 Stanley Cup Finals.

Trades

Players acquired

Players lost

Signings

Draft picks
Detroit's draft picks at the 2003 NHL Entry Draft held at the Gaylord Entertainment Center in Nashville, Tennessee. The Red Wings were slated to pick 27th overall but traded their first pick to the Los Angeles Kings at the 2003 trade deadline.

Farm teams

Grand Rapids Griffins
The Griffins were Detroit's top affiliate in the American Hockey League in 2003–04.

Toledo Storm
The Storm were the Red Wings' ECHL affiliate for the 2003–04 season.

See also
 2003–04 NHL season

Notes

References 

 Player stats: Detroit Red Wings player stats on espn.com
 
 

Detroit Red Wings seasons
Detroit
Detroit
Presidents' Trophy seasons
Detroit Red Wings
Detroit Red Wings